Richard Lavon Johnson (born May 13, 1947) is a former American football running back. He was drafted by the Houston Oilers in the third round of the 1969 NFL Draft. Johnson played college football at Illinois.

College career
Johnson was a member of the Illinois Fighting Illini for four seasons, playing his final three years and starting the last two at fullback. He rushed for 768 yards and six touchdowns on 195 carries in his junior season. As a senior, Johnson finished 20th in the nation with 973 rushing yards and was named second team All-Big Ten Conference and the team Most Valuable Player. He finished his collegiate career with 2,058 rushing yards, fourth-most in school history at the time, and 11 touchdowns.

Professional career
Johnson was selected in the third round (78th overall) of the 1969 NFL/AFL draft by the Houston Oilers. He played in all of the Oilers games during the 1969 season, rushing 11 times for 42 yards with two receptions for 17 yards and one touchdown in his lone professional season.

References

External links

1947 births
Living people
Players of American football from Illinois
American football running backs
Illinois Fighting Illini football players
Houston Oilers players
American Football League players
People from Canton, Illinois